General Sir George Beckwith GCB (1753 – 20 March 1823) was a British Army officer.

Military career
Beckwith was commissioned into the 37th Regiment of Foot in 1771. He distinguished himself as a regimental officer in the American Revolutionary War, where he was assistant to Major Oliver Delancey responsible for British Intelligence. 

In July 1782, he replaced Delancey and after the war he worked for Sir Guy Carleton in Canada. His efforts were aimed at stirring up trouble in Vermont, Florida, Kentucky and Tennessee. At the time Britain thought the weak American government might ask for British help.

He was then appointed Governor and Commander-in-Chief of Bermuda in 1797, when a colonel. His baggage and furniture left England on 23 September 1797, aboard the Caledonia, travelling in a convoy bound for Halifax, Nova Scotia, but was lost when the Caledonia was captured by the French. Beckwith was to follow aboard a Royal Navy frigate and so escaped the fate of his baggage. He arrived in Bermuda in February 1798. Beckwith was later appointed Governor of Saint Vincent in 1806 and Governor of Barbados in 1810.

On 1 May 1809, he was made a Knight of the Order of the Bath (later apparently elevated to Knight Grand Cross of the Order of the Bath) for his Capture of Martinique in 1809 and also led a successful expedition against Guadeloupe, the last French possession in the area, in 1810. He attained the full rank of general in 1814. Sir George Beckwith was Commander-in-Chief, Ireland from 1816 to 1820. He died in London on 20 March 1823.

Family

His father was Major General John Beckwith, who commanded the 20th Regiment of Foot. His brothers were Captain John Beckwith, Thomas Sydney Beckwith and Brigadier General Ferdinand Beckwith. He was also the uncle of Major-General John Charles Beckwith.

References

Bibliography

|-

|-

|-

|-

|-

|-

1753 births
1823 deaths
British Army personnel of the American Revolutionary War
Knights Grand Cross of the Order of the Bath
British Army generals
Commanders-in-Chief, Ireland
British Army personnel of the French Revolutionary Wars
British Army personnel of the Napoleonic Wars
37th Regiment of Foot officers
Royal Irish Fusiliers officers
West India Regiment officers
Members of the Privy Council of Ireland
Governors of British Saint Vincent and the Grenadines
Governors of Barbados
Governors of Bermuda
British Governors of Martinique